Joseph-Ludger Fillion (May 17, 1895 – September 12, 1971) was a Canadian provincial politician.

Born in Alma, Quebec, Fillion was the member of the Legislative Assembly of Quebec for Lac-Saint-Jean from 1931 to 1935 and from 1939 to 1948.

References

1895 births
1971 deaths
People from Alma, Quebec
Quebec Liberal Party MNAs